Belgium has four sea ports and a range of inland ports.

Sea ports
 Port of Antwerp (Antwerp), www.portofantwerp.be
 Port of Bruges-Zeebrugge (Bruges/Zeebrugge), www.zeebruggeport.be
 Port of Ghent (Ghent), www.portofghent.be
 Port of Ostend (Ostend), www.portofoostende.be
 Port of Genk (Genk), www.havengenk.be

Inland ports
 Port of Brussels (Brussels), www.portofbrussels.be
 Port of Charleroi (Charleroi), charleroi.portautonome.be
 Port of La Louvière (La Louvière), www.le-paco.be
 Port of Liège (Liège), www.portdeliege.be

External links
 

Belgium